Jean-Pierre Roy (June 26, 1920 – November 1, 2014) was a Canadian pitcher in Major League Baseball. He pitched in three games during the  season for the Brooklyn Dodgers. He was born in Montreal, Quebec.

While with the minor league Montreal Royals, Roy played with Jackie Robinson, the first African-American to play in the major leagues. Roy retained a friendship with Robinson's widow, Rachel Robinson.

The major highlight of his Montreal years was going 25–11 with a 3.72 ERA in the 1945 season and he compiled an overall 45–28 career record pitching with the Royals.

Roy was later a television commentator for the Montreal Expos from 1968 to 1984 and a public relations representative for the Expos.

He was inducted into the Montreal Expos Hall of Fame in 1995, and the Quebec Baseball Hall of Fame in 2001.

He died on November 1, 2014 at his Pompano Beach, Florida winter home in the United States, at the age of 94.

References

External links

1920 births
2014 deaths
Baseball people from Quebec
Brooklyn Dodgers players
Canadian expatriate baseball players in Mexico
Canadian expatriate baseball players in the United States
Diablos Rojos del México players 
Drummondville Cubs players
Hollywood Stars players
Houston Buffaloes players
Major League Baseball broadcasters
Major League Baseball pitchers
Major League Baseball players from Canada
Mexican League baseball pitchers
Minor league baseball managers
Mobile Shippers players
Montreal Expos announcers
Montreal Royals players
Oklahoma City Indians players
Ottawa A's players
Rochester Red Wings players
St. Jean Braves players
Sacramento Solons players
Sherbrooke Indians players
Baseball players from Montreal
Trois-Rivières Renards players
Trois-Rivières Royals players
Canadian expatriate baseball players in Panama
Canadian Baseball Hall of Fame inductees